[[georgiebadielfoundation.org] 

Georgie Badiel Liberty (born February 7, 1985) is a Burkinabé model and activist living and working in New York City. Badiel was Miss Burkina Faso in 2003 and Miss Africa 2004.

She is also a writer and activist who has taken on the issue of the lack of potable drinking water in her West African homeland.  Therein she runs the Georgie Badiel Foundation which is dedicated to raising funds to support the cause. Now together with the children's book author,
Peter H. Reynolds and Susan Verde, she has co-created the book The Water Princess, a picture book which tells the story of her West African nation's desperate need for aquifers through her life as a young girl who dreams of bringing clean water to her people.  The book was published by Penguin Random House in  2016.

Badiel is married to Chid Liberty and was honored Chevalier Of Merit Burkinabe on February 28 at the Burkina Faso mission in New York.

References

Further reading
 Harper's Bazaar
 Daily Observer
 Teen Vogue
 Italian Vogue
 Essence

Burkinabé writers
Living people
1985 births
Burkinabé female models
Models from New York City
Burkinabé expatriates in the United States
21st-century Burkinabé people